The Massacre films are three interconnected series of slasher films executive-produced by Roger Corman: the Slumber Party Massacre series (1982–1990), the Sorority House Massacre series (1986–1990) and the Cheerleader Massacre series (2003–2011), distributed by New World Pictures and New Concorde. The series also features the standalone film Sharkansas Women's Prison Massacre (2015), and the reboot film Slumber Party Massacre (2021).

All three of the original Slumber Party Massacre films, and the first Sorority House Massacre film, were given limited theatrical releases, while Sorority House Massacre II and III, and both Cheerleader Massacre films were released direct-to-video, and the 2021 reboot released to the Syfy network. The franchise is notable for being primarily directed by women, who direct every Slumber Party Massacre film and the first Sorority House Massacre film.

Background
The title Massacre Collection was utilized in the marketing of the DVD releases of the films, and was not a part of their theatrical or initial home video releases. The films, the first six of which were each produced by Roger Corman, were marketed as an analogous series based on their related content as well as the inclusion of "massacre" in their respective titles.

The Slumber Party Massacre trilogy has the distinction of being the first horror film series in history whose films were exclusively written and directed by women, in addition to the first spin-off film forming the Sorority House Massacre sub-series.

Film series

Slumber Party Massacre series

Between 2000–2003, the first two films were each released twice on DVD by New Concorde, while the third film was released once. These releases featured the Massacre Collection banner. In 2010, all three of the Slumber Party Massacre films were released as a triple feature DVD by Shout! Factory as part of the company's Roger Corman's Cult Classics DVD series.

Shout! Factory released The Slumber Party Massacre on Blu-ray for the first time in March 2014, and on January 17, 2017, Slumber Party Massacre II and III were released as a double feature Blu-ray, also by Shout! Factory. None of these releases featured the Massacre Collection epithet that the New Concorde DVD releases had.

Shout! Factory released a limited edition of the first film on Blu-ray in January 2020, featuring new extras and a steelbook.

A remake, directed by Danishka Esterhazy and simply titled Slumber Party Massacre, premiered on Syfy in 2021.

Sorority House Massacre series

Between 2000–2004, like the Slumber Party Massacre trilogy, New Concorde released the first two films twice on DVD, while the third film was released once. Sorority House Massacre was released on Blu-ray for the first time on November 3, 2014 by Scorpion Releasing. This release was limited to 1,200 copies. As of May 2021, Sorority House Massacre II and III have not been given a Blu-ray release.

As a result of the DVD release success, fourth Sorority House Massacre film began production in 2001 and wrapped principal photography in February 2002, subtitled Final Exam in August. The film was scheduled for release in 2007 on DVD under a new title, The Legacy, but Roger Corman's Concorde Pictures closed up shop and the film was never released. In March 2015, Jim Wynorski released a poster for the film on his official Facebook page with the title Sorority House Massacre: The Final Exam; of December 2022, it is unknown as to whether or not the film will ever be released, although Sam Phillips reprised her role from the film in Cheerleader Massacre, a direct sequel to The Slumber Party Massacre.

Cheerleader Massacre series

The film Cheerleader Massacre, directed by Jim Wynorski, is a semi-direct sequel to the first Slumber Party Massacre film, which itself was followed by a stand-alone sequel titled Cheerleader Massacre 2, directed by Brad Rushing. Cheerleader Massacre was released on DVD in 2003, while Cheerleader Massacre 2 has not been given a release in the United States. As of May 2021, neither film has been given a Blu-ray release.

Stand-alone films
In 2015, Jim Wynorski directed a spin-off of the series, titled Sharkansas Women's Prison Massacre.

Other media
A television series based on the Sorority House Massacre sub-series is in the works by Norman Reedus.

Cast and characters
 This table shows the principal characters and the actors who have portrayed them throughout the franchise.
 A dark grey cell indicates the character was not in the film, or that the character's presence in the film has not yet been announced.
 A  indicates a cameo appearance.
 A  indicates an appearance in onscreen photographs only.
 A  indicates an appearance in archival footage only.
 A  indicates an uncredited role.
 A  indicates a voice-only role.
 A  indicates a younger version of the role.

Notes

References

Citations

Sources

External links
 The Massacre Collection at IMDb
 The Old Hockstatter Place, fansite

 
American film series
Direct-to-video film series
Horror film franchises